Li Hang Wui (born 15 February 1985) is a Hong Kong football coach and a former professional footballer. He is currently the head coach of Hong Kong Premier League club Tai Po.

He was the captain of Hong Kong Olympic football team in 2007.

Career statistics

International

Hong Kong U-23
As of 21 November 2009

Hong Kong
As of 4 October 2011

External links
Profile at HKFA.com
Profile at doha-2006.com

1985 births
Living people
Hong Kong footballers
Hong Kong First Division League players
Hong Kong Premier League players
Hong Kong international footballers
Association football defenders
Citizen AA players
Kitchee SC players
Tai Chung FC players
Hong Kong FC players
Sun Hei SC players
Yokohama FC Hong Kong players
Hong Kong football managers
Footballers at the 2006 Asian Games
Asian Games competitors for Hong Kong